The Last Frontier is an American Pre-Code 12-chapter serial, distributed by RKO Radio Pictures in 1932. The story was based on the novel of the same name by Courtney Ryley Cooper.

The serial starred Lon Chaney, Jr. as the Zorro-esque hero The Black Ghost. Dorothy Gulliver was the leading female star. The total running time of the serial is 213 minutes.

Plot
The outlaw "Tiger" Morris attempts to drive settlers off their land in order to acquire the local gold deposits.  A crusading newspaper editor, Tom Kirby, becomes the masked vigilante, The Black Ghost, to stop him.

Cast
 Lon Chaney, Jr. as Tom Kirby, the editor of the local newspaper and the masked vigilante The Black Ghost
 Dorothy Gulliver as Betty Halliday
 Ralph Bushman as Jeff Maitland
 William Desmond as General George Custer
 Joe Bonomo as Joe, one of Morris' henchman.  Listed as "Kit Gordon" in the credits.
 Pete Morrison as Hank, one of Morris' henchman
 LeRoy Mason as Buck, Morris' spearpoint heavy (chief henchman)
 Yakima Canutt as Wild Bill Hickok
 Mary Jo Desmond as Aggie Kirby
 Slim Cole as Uncle Happy
 Richard Neill as Leige "Tiger" Morris, outlaw
 Judith Barrie as Rose Maitland
 Claude Payton as Colonel Halliday
 Ben Corbett as Bad Ben, one of Morris' henchman
 Frank Lackteen as Chief Pawnee Blood
 Fritzi Fern as Mariah

Production
The Last Frontier was RKO's only serial.

Chapter titles
 The Black Ghost Rides
 The Thundering Herd
 The Black Ghost Strikes
 The Fatal Shot
 Clutching Sands
 The Terror Trail
 Doomed
 Facing Death
 Thundering Doom
 The Life Line
 Driving Danger
 The Black Ghost's Last Ride
Source:

See also
 List of film serials by year
 List of film serials by studio

References

External links
 
 

1932 films
1930s vigilante films
Films directed by Spencer Gordon Bennet
Film serials
American black-and-white films
1930s English-language films
1932 Western (genre) films
RKO Pictures short films
Cultural depictions of George Armstrong Custer
American Western (genre) films
Films with screenplays by George H. Plympton
Films based on novels
1930s American films